Like a Corpse Standing in Desperation is the title of a career-spanning rarities box set by darkwave band Sopor Aeternus & the Ensemble of Shadows that was released in 2005. The recordings span fifteen years of "original demos, rarities & documented failures." Re-issued for the first time are the out-of-print EP Ehjeh Ascher Ehjeh and remix album Voyager - The Jugglers of Jusa, along with the never before heard demo tape Es reiten die Toten so schnell... and the extensively bootlegged Flowers in Formaldehyde.

Overview
Like a Corpse... was created in response to the high prices fans would have to pay on eBay for bootlegged copies of out of print EPs and albums. John A. Rivers, who personally oversaw the remastering of the first six Sopor Aeternus albums, as well as the two to follow (2003's "Es reiten die Toten so schnell" (or: the Vampyre sucking at his own Vein) and 2004's "La Chambre D'Echo" - Where the dead Birds sing) supervised and remastered the contents of this box set. The set also included the concurrently released single, "The Goat" / "The Bells have stopped ringing".

Barring the aforementioned single and demo tape, four previously unreleased songs were included: "White Body", "Watch your Step", "As Fire kissed the Echo Twins" and "The Widow's Dream"; the last of which is based on the Rozz Williams song "A Widow's Dream". "White Body" is sourced from one of the two still-unreleased demo tapes by Sopor Aeternus.

The box set contains three CDs, packaged in their own hardcover booklet; the book also includes liner notes by Anna-Varney Cantodea herself, as well as "the only interview/publication that I have kept over the years." Also included is a working facsimile of the original cassette tape for Es reiten die Toten so schnell..., complete with both original and re-packaged artwork (on both sides); two DVDs (one in NTSC format, the other in PAL) containing five Sopor videos; a T-shirt, a poster, a sticker, patches, buttons, a decorative attachment for a funeral wreath and a signed and numbered certificate of authenticity.

Of interest to some listeners are the two different mixes of the demo tape material. The demo appears on the first disc of the collection in a remastered format, removing tape hiss but adding heavy reverb effects; the cassette included in the set contains the songs as originally mixed. The songs from Jekura - Deep the Eternal Forest and Ehjeh Ascher Ehjeh were also remastered in a similar fashion. Also of note are the two versions of the video for "Deep the eternal Forest"; one, with Anna-Varney Cantodea in black robes, is found on the NTSC DVD; while the other, with Cantodea in white robes, is found on the PAL DVD. The menus of each disc are different as well.

Track listing

Tracks 1-8 comprise the demo cassette Es reiten die Toten so schnell.... Tracks 10-12 and 14 are taken from the compilation Jekura - Deep the Eternal Forest. Tracks 15-20 form the complete Ehjeh Ascher Ehjeh EP.

Tracks 1-12 form the Voyager album proper. Tracks 13-15 are bonus tracks, with the latter two forming the Goat / The Bells have stopped ringing single.

Additional material

Personnel
Es reiten die Toten so schnell...
 Varney: vocals and instruments
 Holger: instruments

Ehjeh Ascher Ehjeh, Jekura - Deep the Eternal Forest and all outtakes Varney: All vocals, instruments and programming

"Voyager - The Jugglers of Jusa"
 Una Fallada: Violin
 Matthias Eder: Cello
 Gerrit Fischer: Guitar
 Constanze Spengler: Lute
 Anna-Varney Cantodea: Vocals, all other instruments and programmingFlowers in Formaldehyde
 Susannah Simmons: Violin
 Elizabeth Tollington: Cello
 Miriam Hughes: Flute
 Tonia Price: Clarinet
 Andrew Pettitt: Oboe
 Doreena Gor: Bassoon
 Tim Barber: Trumpet
 Julian Turner: Trombone
 Anthony Bartley: Tuba
 Paul Brook: Drums
 Anna-Varney Cantodea: Vocals, all other instruments and programming

Sopor Aeternus and The Ensemble of Shadows albums
2005 compilation albums